A fossil word is a word that is broadly obsolete but remains in current use due to its presence within an idiom, word sense, or phrase. An example for a word sense is 'navy' in 'merchant navy', which means 'commercial fleet' (although that sense of navy is obsolete elsewhere). An example for a phrase is 'in point' (relevant), which is retained in the larger phrases 'case in point' (also 'case on point' in the legal context) and 'in point of fact', but is rarely used outside of a legal context.

English-language examples 
 ado, as in "without further ado" or "with no further ado" or  "much ado about nothing", although the homologous form "to-do" remains attested ("make a to-do", "a big to-do", etc.)
 amok, as in "run amok"
 bandy, as in "bandy about" or "bandy-legged"
 bated, as in "wait with bated breath", although the derived term "abate" remains in non-idiom-specific use
 beck, as in "at one's beck and call", although the verb form "beckon" is still used in non-idiom-specific use
 champing, as in "champing at the bit", where "champ" is an obsolete precursor to "chomp", in current use
 coign, as in "coign of vantage"
 deserts, as in "just deserts", although singular "desert" in the sense of "state of deserving" occurs in nonidiom-specific contexts including law and philosophy. "Dessert" is a French loanword, meaning "removing what has been served," and has only a distant etymological connection.
 dint, as in "by dint of"
 dudgeon, as in "in high dudgeon"
 eke, as in "eke out"
 fettle, as in "in fine fettle", although the verb, 'to fettle', remains in specialized use in metal casting.
 fro, as in "to and fro"
 hark, as in "hark back to" or "hark at you"
 helter skelter, as in "scattered helter skelter about the office", Middle English  to hasten
 hither, as in "come hither", "hither and thither", and "hither and yon"
 inclement, as in "inclement weather”
 jetsam, as in "flotsam and jetsam", except in legal contexts (especially admiralty, property, and international law)
 kith, as in "kith and kin"
 nap, meaning to steal, as in "kidnap"
 lo, as in "lo and behold"
 loggerheads as in "at loggerheads" or loggerhead turtle
 muchness as in "much of a muchness"
 neap, as in "neap tide"
 pale, as in "beyond the pale"
 shebang, as in "the whole shebang", although the word is now used as an unrelated common noun in programmers' jargon.
 shrive, preserved only in inflected forms occurring only as part of fixed phrases: 'shrift' in "short shrift" and 'shrove' in "Shrove Tuesday"
 spick, as in "spick and span"
 turpitude, as in "moral turpitude"
 vim, as in "vim and vigor"
 wedlock, as in "out of wedlock"
 wend, as in "wend your way"
 yore, as in "of yore", usually "days of yore"

"Born fossils"
These words were formed from other languages, by elision, or by mincing of other fixed phrases.
 caboodle, as in "kit and caboodle" (evolved from "kit and boodle", itself a fixed phrase borrowed as a unit from Dutch )
 druthers, as in "if I had my druthers..." (formed by elision from "would rather" and never occurring outside this phrase to begin with)
 tarnation, as in "what in tarnation...?" (evolved in the context of fixed phrases formed by mincing of previously fixed phrases that include the term "damnation")
 nother, as in "a whole nother..." (fixed phrase formed by rebracketing another as a nother, then inserting whole for emphasis; almost never occurs outside this phrase)

See also 
 Bound morpheme
 Collocation — tendency of one word to occur near another
 Cranberry morpheme — morpheme which has no independent meaning in a lexeme
 Fossilization (linguistics)
 Siamese twins (linguistics)

References 

Historical linguistics
Lists of English words
Vocabulary
Archaic words and phrases
Idioms